Zalizne (formerly Artemove is a city in Toretsk municipality, Donetsk Oblast, Ukraine. Population: ; 6,725 (2001).

On 19 May 2016, Artemove was renamed to Zalizne, conforming to the law prohibiting names of Communist origin.

Demographics
Native language as of the Ukrainian Census of 2001:
Russian  82.82%
Ukrainian  16.75%
Belarusian  0.20%
Armenian  0.11%

Gallery

References

Cities in Donetsk Oblast
Cities of district significance in Ukraine
Populated places established in the Russian Empire
City name changes in Ukraine
Former Soviet toponymy in Ukraine
Bakhmut Raion